Eric Hübsch is a Grand Prix motorcycle racer from Germany.

Career statistics

By season

Races by year
(key)

References

External links
 Profile on motogp.com

1990 births
German motorcycle racers
Living people
125cc World Championship riders